TOI-1601 b is an exoplanet that was discovered by TESS in January 2021. It has an orbital period of 5.3 days and is located 1098 light years away from Earth. It also has a mass similar to that of Jupiter.

References 

Exoplanets discovered in 2021
Exoplanets discovered by TESS